
Maurice Charles O'Connell (13 January 1812 – 23 March 1879), was a Queensland pioneer and president of the Queensland Legislative Council.

Early life
O'Connell was born at Sydney in 1812. His father was Sir Maurice Charles O'Connell, his mother was Mary (née Bligh, formerly Putland) a daughter of Governor William Bligh. He was educated at the high school, Edinburgh; Dublin and Paris.

Army career
O'Connell entered the army as an ensign at 16 and joined the 73rd Regiment at Gibraltar. In 1835 he volunteered for foreign service as colonel with the British Legion in Spain, which he himself had raised in the county of Cork and other parts of Munster, to sustain the cause of the Spanish Queen and constitution against the insurgent Carlists. Later on he became Deputy Adjutant-General, and ultimately succeeded Sir De Lacy Evans as general of brigade in command of the British Auxiliary Legion in Spain. The Legion was disbanded on 8 December 1837, after taking heavy casualties during the battle of Andoain. Sir Maurice O'Connell was rewarded for his services by having the knighthood of several Spanish orders conferred upon him.

On his return to England he was appointed to the 51st Regiment, and afterwards becoming captain in the 28th, was appointed military secretary on the staff of his father in New South Wales in 1835. When the 28th was recalled to England, Sir Maurice sold out, and engaged in pastoral pursuits. He afterwards resigned from the army and took up land.

Political career
O'Connell was elected a member of the New South Wales Legislative Council in August 1845 for the electoral district of Port Phillip. He was appointed commissioner of crown lands for the Burnett district in 1848, became government resident at Port Curtis (now Gladstone) in 1854, and held this position until 1860.

He was nominated as one of the original members of the Queensland Legislative Council in 1860, was a minister without portfolio in the first ministry under Herbert, and introduced in July of that year a bill to provide for primary education in Queensland. Shortly afterwards he was elected president of the legislative council and retained this position until his death.

In 1863, O'Connell was one of the founders and original trustees of the Queensland Turf Club, having arranged a land grant of 322 acres of land at Eagle Farm in Brisbane for the purpose of horse racing, now known as the Eagle Farm Racecourse. The other trustees were John Frederick McDougall and George Harris (all three were Members of the Queensland Legislative Council).

In 1865 O'Connell, Augustus Charles Gregory and John Douglas applied for a special grant of land to erect a Masonic Hall in Brisbane. This was granted on 15 January 1865.

Late life and legacy
O'Connell was knighted in 1871. He was commandant of the local military forces, and on four occasions was acting-governor of Queensland and showed tact and ability in this position. He was president of the Australasian Association, and of the Queensland Turf Club, and was a vice-president of the National Agricultural Association.

O'Connell died of cancer in Brisbane on 23 March 1879 at Queensland Parliament House. He was buried in Toowong Cemetery.

References

 

1812 births
1879 deaths
Members of the New South Wales Legislative Council
Members of the Queensland Legislative Council
Presidents of the Queensland Legislative Council
British Auxiliary Legion personnel
73rd Regiment of Foot officers
28th Regiment of Foot officers
Maurice Charles
Burials at Toowong Cemetery
Pre-Separation Queensland
19th-century Australian public servants